Magikarp, known in Japan as , is a Pokémon species in Nintendo and Game Freak's Pokémon franchise. Created by Ken Sugimori, Magikarp first appeared in the video games Pokémon Red and Blue and subsequent sequels. They have later appeared in various merchandise, spinoff entries, and animated and printed adaptations of the franchise. Known as the Fish Pokémon, Magikarp is found in many bodies of water, especially lakes, rivers, and ponds. Magikarp received mixed responses from critics, with some criticism directed towards it for being useless or pointless.

Description
Magikarp is a red, medium-sized fish, although shiny Magikarp are golden in color. Its notable characteristics include large, heavy scales. Its fins are primarily white, but it has a stiff, three-pointed fin on its back and a four-pointed fin on its stomach which are both yellow. The shape of the dorsal fin resembles a crown, leading to its Japanese name Koiking. It also has long barbels, which are white on females and tan on males. Although this Pokémon is capable of surviving in even the most polluted ponds, it is usually overlooked by trainers because it is pathetically weak. Even in the heat of battle it will do nothing but flop around. They are normally seen using Splash, which is unusual, as it makes them easy targets to predators. Before the species multiplied, it is believed that the ancestors of Magikarp were actually much stronger than the Magikarp seen today, and this belief has led scientists to research this species. Long-lived Magikarp are able to utilize their immense splashing power to leap high enough to jump mountains. Magikarp is found in many bodies of water, such as lakes, rivers, and ponds. It is not a strong swimmer, and currents in the water will sweep it downstream.

The concept of Magikarp evolving into Gyarados is based on the Chinese mythological tale of the carps leaping over the Dragon Gate. According to the legend, carps that leap over a legendary waterfall called the Dragon Gate are rewarded for their perseverance and transformed into dragons. In the Nintendo 64 game, Pokémon Snap, the only way for the player to see a wild Gyarados is to knock a Magikarp into a waterfall, where it will evolve. 
In the first generation of Pokémon games, Magikarp can only learn 2 moves by level. The moves are Splash and Tackle, at levels 1 and 15, respectively.
From generations 2 to 8, Magikarp can learn the aforementioned moves at those respective levels, plus the move Flail, at level 25.
In some generations, Magikarp can learn Hydro Pump and Bounce, however, the method to learn these moves is not by leveling up.
There are some Magikarp that have been awarded to players (either in-game or by events) that know a few moves other than the mentioned before, however, those are few specimens.

Appearances

In video games
In the video game series, Magikarp is seen commonly when fishing with an Old or Good Rod. In Pokémon Red and Blue, and their remakes, an NPC will sell the player a Magikarp. In Pokémon Diamond and Pearl, Magikarp appear flopping around in a dried-up lake. It has appeared in several Pokémon games later such as Pokémon Yellow, Pokémon Gold and Silver, Pokémon Crystal, Pokémon Ruby and Sapphire, Pokémon FireRed and LeafGreen, Pokémon Emerald, Pokémon Platinum, Pokémon HeartGold and SoulSilver, Pokémon Black and White, Pokémon Black 2 and White 2, Pokémon X and Y, Pokémon Omega Ruby and Alpha Sapphire, Pokémon Sun and Moon, Pokémon Ultra Sun and Ultra Moon, Pokémon: Let's Go, Pikachu! and Let's Go, Eevee!, Pokémon Sword and Shield, and Pokémon Brilliant Diamond and Shining Pearl.

Outside of the main series, in Pokémon Stadium, Magikarp featured in its own mini-game called "Magikarp Splash", in which players must Splash high enough to hit the button at the top of the screen as many times as it can. It also appeared in Pokémon Snap, Pokémon Pinball, Pokémon Channel, Pokémon Pinball: Ruby & Sapphire, Pokémon Trozei!, Pokémon Mystery Dungeon: Blue Rescue Team and Red Rescue Team, Pokémon Ranger, Pokémon Mystery Dungeon: Explorers of Time and Explorers of Darkness, Pokémon Mystery Dungeon: Explorers of Sky, Pokémon Rumble, PokéPark Wii: Pikachu's Adventure, Pokémon Rumble Blast, PokéPark 2: Wonders Beyond, Pokémon Conquest , Pokémon Rumble U, Pokémon Battle Trozei, Pokémon Shuffle, Pokémon Rumble World, Pokémon Picross, and Pokémon Rumble Rush. A mobile video game, called Pokémon: Magikarp Jump, was announced in February 2017 under the title Splash! Magikarp, and was released for Android and iOS on 25 May 2017. It also appears in Pokémon Go and New Pokémon Snap.

In other media
In the anime, Magikarp has appeared several times, most notably as the subject of a running gag in which a salesman attempts to trick Team Rocket into buying Magikarp in various guises, the first one being in Battle Aboard the St. Anne. In The Joy of Pokémon, a Nurse Joy from the Orange Islands befriended a giant Magikarp that saved her as a child. It evolved into an equally large Gyarados, but it remained friendly, which happens rarely. In The Wacky Watcher, Ash, Misty, and Tracey help a Pokémon Watcher named Dr. Quackenpoker observe the migration and evolution of a school of Magikarp. Another, in Ya See We Want an Evolution, was nicknamed the strongest Magikarp. This Magikarp was unique in that it was in fact able to battle very well, even knocking out Pikachu. An official music video of Magikarp was made called "I Love Magikarp", the song featured how weak Magikarp is. It appears also on Pokétoon Magikarp’s Journey.

In film
Magikarp appears in Detective Pikachu when Pikachu throws Magikarp and immediately evolved into Gyarados as it battles with Charizard.

Reception
 GamesRadar described it as "the ultimate in terms of being the strongest Pokémon", though noted its evolution Gyarados as one of the "biggest" characters in the series. IGN called it "possibly the most docile, unassuming, and weak of all the monsters in the Pokémon world" and further described it as serving "solely as comic relief", until its evolution into Gyarados. IGN criticized Magikarp as the "worst Pokémon ever", citing its low statistics and inability to learn moves from Technical or Hidden Machines, calling it a "Water wussymon." An IGN guide jokingly noted a trainer in Pokémon Platinum as having the "best team among those in the area" due to having six Magikarps, five of which are unable to attack. Steven Bogos of The Escapist listed Magikarp as 61st of their favorite Pokemon, stating that one of the most useless Pokemon, that if you can manage to level up, turns into one of the most bad-ass: Gyarados. 

The book Gaming Cultures and Place in Asia-Pacific cited it as an "example of a common recurring and weak element" in the games, whose presence rather than function was to "emphasize the exclusivity and strength of other, rarer creatures for players to find". Loredana Lipperini, author of the book Generazione Pokémon: i bambini e l'invasione planetaria dei nuovi, described it as "innocuous-looking." Stephen Totilo of Kotakualso gave criticism to Magikarp, commenting that the using it as his character in Pokémon Rumble made him learn the "hard way" that he "couldn't have had a worse idea." The Australian Broadcasting Corporation's Good Game has praised PokéPark Wii: Pikachu's Adventure for its faithfulness to various Pokémon's abilities; while Torterra and Hitmontop were described as using Razor Leaf and Rapid Spin, they merely described Magikarp's actions as just "being Magikarp." In Pokémon Sword and Shield, Magikarp was one of the most hated Pokémon due to some players using Magikarp during the game's multiplayer raids. The website Bright Side of the Sun used an analogy involving Magikarp, commenting that the words "defense" and "rebounding" were "tossed around" more by their coach to them than "a Magikarp card at a Pokémon convention in 1997." Patricia Hernandez of Kotaku said that Magikarp is the best Pokémon Go buddy. Shane Redding of Screen Rant ranked Magikarp as Generation 1 Pokémon that make no sense. Kyle Hilliard of GameInformer listed Magikarp as one of the pointless video game pets that we love. Gortexfogg of Destructoid claimed that Magikarp is the greatest Pokémon, stating that "because he entirely fails at being a Pokémon. He is just a fish, a simple carp. It is that irony that sets him apart as the greatest." Khee Hoon Chan of Paste noted that while players who dislike Magikarp, He had to defend it due to still how useful the Pokemon is, and stating that " existence is still a labor of love, one that has turned into a legacy. It even inspired a song."

A variety of merchandise depicting Magikarp have been produced such as Poké lids, Toys, Plush, 18k luxurious gold and silver necklaces, and the Pokémon Trading Card Game. Magikarp has been also cosplayed by a Twitch streamer to compete other hot tub streamers, and a baby on Honolulu Comic book convention being deemed to be the cutest cosplay ever.

References

Further reading

External links

 Magikarp on Bulbapedia
 Magikarp on Pokemon.com
 Webpage listing the moves Magikarp can learn on Pokémon Red, Blue, and Yellow

Fictional fish
Pokémon species
Video game characters introduced in 1996
Video game characters with water abilities

ca:Línia evolutiva de Magikarp#Magikarp
es:Anexo:Pokémon de la primera generación#Magikarp
pl:Lista Pokémonów (121-140)#Magikarp